Blue River may refer to:

Rivers

Canada
Blue River (North Thompson River tributary), British Columbia
Blue River (Dease River tributary), British Columbia

China
Yangtze River, sometimes referred to as the Blue River in older English sources

New Zealand
Blue River (New Zealand), South Island

United States
Blue River (Arizona), a tributary of the San Francisco River
Blue River (Colorado), a tributary of the Colorado River
Blue River (Indiana), a tributary of the Ohio River
Blue River (Missouri River tributary), in Missouri
Blue River (Oklahoma), a tributary of the Red River
Blue River (Oregon), a tributary of the McKenzie River
Blue River (Wisconsin), a river of Wisconsin, a tributary of the Wisconsin River

Communities

Canada
Blue River, British Columbia, an unincorporated settlement
Blue River station, a Canadian National Railway station
Blue River Indian Reserve No. 1, in British Columbia

United States
Blue River, Colorado
Blue River, Indiana
Blue River, Kentucky
Blue River, Oregon
Blue River, Wisconsin

Other uses
Blue River (film), a 1995 television film
Blue River (album), by Eric Andersen, 1972
"Blue River" (song), by Elvis Presley, 1965
Blue River, a 1992 novel by Ethan Canin, basis for the film
"Blue River", a 1920s piano roll cut by Dagmar Nordstrom

See also

Big Blue River (disambiguation)
Little Blue River (disambiguation)
Blue River Township (disambiguation)
Río Azul (Spanish for Blue River), a Mayan archaeological site